Alain Pinel Realtors (APR) is a residential real estate company in California. The company focuses on luxury real estate in the San Francisco Bay Area. 

The firm has 1,400 agents in 32 offices. In 2010 APR was ranked the sixth largest residential real estate firm in the United States.

History
APR was co-founded in 1990 by Alain Pinel ( original CEO and President), together with Helen Pastorino and Paul L. Hulme (present CEO). 

In 2008, Alain Pinel Realtors opened Alain Pinel Investment Group in San Francisco to focus on commercial real estate.

Merger
As of May 21, 2019, Alain Pinel Realtors merged with Compass, Inc., a New York real estate brokerage firm, that also acquired Paragon Real Estate Group in 2018.

References

External links
Alain Pinel Realtors
Realtors On eXp Realty
Realtors Fees Calculator

Real estate services companies of the United States
Real estate companies established in 1990
Companies based in California